Lucien Van Weydeveld (born 25 November 1926, date of death unknown) was a Belgian field hockey player. He competed at the 1948 Summer Olympics and the 1952 Summer Olympics.

References

External links
 

1926 births
Year of death missing
Belgian male field hockey players
Olympic field hockey players of Belgium
Field hockey players at the 1948 Summer Olympics
Field hockey players at the 1952 Summer Olympics